Bolton is a town in Greater Manchester, England, historically in Lancashire.

Bolton may also refer to:

People 
 Bolton (surname)
 Bolton Smilie, a character in the BBC TV drama Waterloo Road

Places

Australia 
 Bolton, Victoria

Canada 
 Bolton, Ontario
 Bolton-Est, Quebec, Eastern Townships 
 West Bolton, Quebec, Eastern Townships

United Kingdom 
 Metropolitan Borough of Bolton, Greater Manchester
 County Borough of Bolton (former)
 Bolton (UK Parliament constituency)
 Bolton, Bradford, West Yorkshire, in Bolton and Undercliffe
 Bolton, County Armagh, a townland in County Armagh, Northern Ireland
 Bolton, Cumbria
 Bolton, East Riding of Yorkshire
 Bolton, Northumberland
 Bolton, East Lothian

Places with similar names 
 Bolton-by-Bowland, Lancashire
 Bolton-le-Sands, Lancashire
 Bolton upon Dearne, South Yorkshire
 Bolton-on-Swale, North Yorkshire
 Bolton Abbey, North Yorkshire
 Bolton Percy, North Yorkshire
 Boltonfellend, Cumbria
 Boltongate, Cumbria
 Castle Bolton, North Yorkshire
 Boltons, Cumbria

United States 
 Bolton, Connecticut
 Bolton, Atlanta, Georgia, a neighborhood
 Bolton, Illinois
 Bolton, Kansas
 Bolton, Massachusetts
 Bolton, Michigan
 Bolton, Mississippi
 Bolton, Missouri
 Bolton, New York
 Bolton Landing, New York
 Bolton, North Carolina
 Bolton, Ohio
 Bolton, Vermont, a New England town
 Bolton (CDP), Vermont, village in the town
 Boltonville, Wisconsin
 Bolton Field, an airport in Columbus, Ohio

See also 
 Bolton Group, an Italian business conglomerate
 Bolton, a New Zealand Company sailing ship that bought immigrants to Wellington, New Zealand in 1840
 Bolton Wanderers F.C., an English professional football club
 Bolten, a surname
 Boulton (disambiguation)
 House Bolton, fictional family in George RR Martin's A Song of Ice and Fire series